opened in Aomori, Aomori Prefecture, Japan, in 2015.

See also
 List of Historic Sites of Japan (Aomori)
 Mutsu Province
 Aomori Prefectural Museum
 List of Important Tangible Folk Cultural Properties

References

External links
  Aomori Museum of History

Museums in Aomori Prefecture
Aomori (city)
Museums established in 2015
2015 establishments in Japan